Harry Green may refer to:

Harry Green (Australian footballer) (1920–1977), Australian rules footballer
Harry Green (footballer, born 1860) (1860–1900), English footballer
Harry Green (footballer, born 1908) (1908–?), English footballer
Harry Green (runner) (1886–1934), British long-distance runner

See also
Harry Greene (disambiguation)
Henry Green (disambiguation)
Harold Green (disambiguation)